The 2014–15 Princeton Tigers men's basketball team represented Princeton University during the 2014–15 NCAA Division I men's basketball season. The Tigers, led by fourth year head coach Mitch Henderson, played their home games at Jadwin Gymnasium and were members of the Ivy League. They finished the season 16–14, 9–5 in Ivy League play to finish in third place.

Awards and accomplishments

Spencer Weisz earned second-team All-Ivy League recognition in 2015.  As a sophomore, in 2014-15 he was 6th in the Ivy League in 3-point field goal percentage (.408), 7th in 3-point field goals (51), and 8th in scoring (11.6).

Roster

Schedule

|-
!colspan=8 style="background:#000000; color:#FF6F00;"| Regular season

See also
 2014–15 Princeton Tigers women's basketball team

References

Princeton Tigers men's basketball seasons
Princeton
Princeton Tigers men's basketball
Princeton Tigers men's basketball